Enteromius boboi is a species of ray-finned fish in the genus Enteromius which is endemic to the River Farmington in the Gibi mountains of Liberia.

Named in honor of one of the local men who helped William M. Munn, the director of the National Zoological Park (Washington, D.C.), collect fishes in Liberia.

References

 

Enteromius
Taxa named by Leonard Peter Schultz
Fish described in 1942